Wireless telegraphy or radiotelegraphy is transmission of text messages by radio waves, analogous to electrical telegraphy using cables. Before about 1910, the term wireless telegraphy was also used for other experimental technologies for transmitting telegraph signals without wires.   In radiotelegraphy, information is transmitted by pulses of radio waves of two different lengths called "dots" and "dashes", which spell out text messages, usually in Morse code. In a manual system, the sending operator taps on a switch called a telegraph key which turns the transmitter on and off, producing the pulses of radio waves. At the receiver the pulses are audible in the receiver's speaker as beeps, which are translated back to text by an operator who knows Morse code. 

Radiotelegraphy was the first means of radio communication. The first practical radio transmitters and receivers invented in 1894–1895 by Guglielmo Marconi used radiotelegraphy. It continued to be the only type of radio transmission during the first few decades of radio, called the "wireless telegraphy era" up until World War I, when the development of amplitude modulation (AM) radiotelephony allowed sound (audio) to be transmitted by radio. Beginning about 1908, powerful transoceanic radiotelegraphy stations transmitted commercial telegram traffic between countries at rates up to 200 words per minute.

Radiotelegraphy was used for long-distance person-to-person commercial, diplomatic, and military text communication throughout the first half of the 20th century. It became a strategically important capability during the two world wars since a nation without long-distance radiotelegraph stations could be isolated from the rest of the world by an enemy cutting its submarine telegraph cables. Radiotelegraphy remains popular in amateur radio. It is also taught by the military for use in emergency communications. However, commercial radiotelegraphy is obsolete.

Overview

Wireless telegraphy or radiotelegraphy, commonly called CW (continuous wave), ICW (interrupted continuous wave) transmission, or on-off keying, and designated by the International Telecommunication Union as emission type A1A or A2A, is a radio communication method. It was transmitted by several different modulation methods during its history. The primitive spark-gap transmitters used until 1920 transmitted damped waves, which had very wide bandwidth and tended to interfere with other transmissions. This type of emission was banned by 1934, except for some legacy use on ships.  The vacuum tube (valve) transmitters which came into use after 1920 transmitted code by pulses of unmodulated sinusoidal carrier wave called continuous wave (CW), which is still used today. To receive CW transmissions, the receiver requires a circuit called a beat frequency oscillator (BFO).  The third type of modulation, frequency-shift keying (FSK) was used mainly by radioteletype networks (RTTY). Morse code radiotelegraphy was gradually replaced by radioteletype in most high volume applications by World War II.  

In manual radiotelegraphy the sending operator manipulates a switch called a telegraph key, which turns the radio transmitter on and off, producing pulses of unmodulated carrier wave of different lengths called "dots" and "dashes", which encode characters of text in Morse code. At the receiving location, Morse code is audible in the receiver's earphone or speaker as a sequence of buzzes or beeps, which is translated back to text by an operator who knows Morse code. With automatic radiotelegraphy teleprinters at both ends use a code such as the International Telegraph Alphabet No. 2 and produced typed text.

Radiotelegraphy is obsolete in commercial radio communication, and its last civilian use, requiring maritime shipping radio operators to use Morse code for emergency communications, ended in 1999 when the International Maritime Organization switched to the satellite-based GMDSS system.  However it is still used by amateur radio operators, and military services require signalmen to be trained in Morse code for emergency communication. A CW coastal station, KSM, still exists in California, run primarily as a museum by volunteers, and occasional contacts with ships are made. In a minor legacy use, VHF omnidirectional range (VOR)  and NDB radio beacons in the aviation radio navigation service still transmit their one to three letter identifiers in Morse code. 

Radiotelegraphy is popular amongst radio amateurs world-wide, who commonly refer to it as continuous wave, or just CW. A 2021 analysis of over 700 million communications logged by the Club Log blog, and a similar review of data logged by the American Radio Relay League, both show that wireless telegraphy is the 2nd most popular mode of amateur radio communication, accounting for nearly 20% of contacts. This makes it more popular than voice communication, but not as popular as the FT8 digital mode, which accounted for 60% of amateur radio contacts made in 2021. Since 2003, knowledge of Morse code and wireless telegraphy has no longer been required to obtain an amateur radio license in many countries, it is, however, still required in some countries to obtain a licence of a different class. As of 2021, licence Class A in Belarus and Estonia, or the General class in Monaco, or Class 1 in Ukraine require Morse proficiency to access the full amateur radio spectrum including the high frequency (HF) bands. Further, CEPT Class 1 licence in Ireland, and Class 1 in Russia, both of which require proficiency in wireless telegraphy, offer additional privileges: a shorter and more desirable call sign in both countries, and the right to use a higher transmit power in Russia.

Non-radio methods

Efforts to find a way to transmit telegraph signals without wires grew out of the success of electric telegraph networks, the first instant telecommunication systems.  Developed beginning in the 1830s, a telegraph line was a person-to-person text message system consisting of multiple telegraph offices linked by an overhead wire supported on telegraph poles. To send a message, an operator at one office would tap on a switch called a telegraph key, creating pulses of electric current which spelled out a message in Morse code. When the key was pressed, it would connect a battery to the telegraph line, sending current down the wire. At the receiving office, the current pulses would operate a telegraph sounder, a device that would make a "click" sound when it received each pulse of current. The operator at the receiving station who knew Morse code would translate the clicking sounds to text and write down the message. The ground was used as the return path for current in the telegraph circuit, to avoid having to use a second overhead wire.

By the 1860s, the telegraph was the standard way to send most urgent commercial, diplomatic and military messages, and industrial nations had built continent-wide telegraph networks, with submarine telegraph cables allowing telegraph messages to bridge oceans. However installing and maintaining a telegraph line linking distant stations was very expensive, and wires could not reach some locations such as ships at sea. Inventors realized if a way could be found to send electrical impulses of Morse code between separate points without a connecting wire, it could revolutionize communications.

The successful solution to this problem was the discovery of radio waves in 1887, and the development of practical radiotelegraphy transmitters and receivers by about 1899, described in the next section. However, this was preceded by a 50-year history of ingenious but ultimately unsuccessful experiments by inventors to achieve wireless telegraphy by other means.

Ground, water, and air conduction
Several wireless electrical signaling schemes based on the (sometimes erroneous) idea that electric currents could be conducted long-range through water, ground, and air were investigated for telegraphy before practical radio systems became available.

The original telegraph lines used two wires between the two stations to form a complete electrical circuit or "loop". In 1837, however, Carl August von Steinheil of Munich, Germany, found that by connecting one leg of the apparatus at each station to metal plates buried in the ground, he could eliminate one wire and use a single wire for telegraphic communication. This led to speculation that it might be possible to eliminate both wires and therefore transmit telegraph signals through the ground without any wires connecting the stations. Other attempts were made to send the electric current through bodies of water, to span rivers, for example.

US inventors William Henry Ward (1871) and Mahlon Loomis (1872) developed electrical conduction systems based on the erroneous belief that there was an electrified atmospheric stratum accessible at low altitude. They thought atmosphere current, connected with a return path using "Earth currents" would allow for wireless telegraphy as well as supply power for the telegraph, doing away with artificial batteries. A more practical demonstration of wireless transmission via conduction came in Amos Dolbear's 1879 magneto electric telephone that used ground conduction to transmit over a distance of a quarter of a mile.

In the 1890s inventor Nikola Tesla worked on an air and ground conduction wireless electric power transmission system, similar to Loomis', which he planned to include wireless telegraphy. Tesla's experiments had led him to incorrectly conclude that he could use the entire globe of the Earth to conduct electrical energy and his 1901 large scale application of his ideas, a high-voltage wireless power station, now called Wardenclyffe Tower, lost funding and was abandoned after a few years.

Telegraphic communication using earth conductivity was eventually found to be limited to impractically short distances, as was communication conducted through water, or between trenches during World War I.

Electrostatic and electromagnetic induction

Both electrostatic and electromagnetic induction were used to develop wireless telegraph systems that saw limited commercial application. In the United States, Thomas Edison, in the mid-1880s, patented an electromagnetic induction system he called "grasshopper telegraphy", which allowed telegraphic signals to jump the short distance between a running train and telegraph wires running parallel to the tracks. This system was successful technically but not economically, as there turned out to be little interest by train travelers in the use of an on-board telegraph service. During the Great Blizzard of 1888, this system was used to send and receive wireless messages from trains buried in snowdrifts. The disabled trains were able to maintain communications via their Edison induction wireless telegraph systems, perhaps the first successful use of wireless telegraphy to send distress calls. Edison would also help to patent a ship-to-shore communication system based on electrostatic induction.

The most successful creator of an electromagnetic induction telegraph system was William Preece, chief engineer of Post Office Telegraphs of the General Post Office (GPO) in the United Kingdom. Preece first noticed the effect in 1884 when overhead telegraph wires in Grays Inn Road were accidentally carrying messages sent on buried cables. Tests in Newcastle succeeded in sending a quarter of a mile using parallel rectangles of wire. However, his induction system required extensive lengths of antenna wires, many kilometers long, at both the sending and receiving ends. The length of those sending and receiving wires needed to be about the same length as the width of the water or land to be spanned. For example, for Preece's station to span the English Channel from Dover, England, to the coast of France would require sending and receiving wires of about  along the two coasts. These facts made the system impractical on ships, boats, and ordinary islands, which are much smaller than Great Britain or Greenland. Also, the relatively short distances that a practical Preece system could span meant that it had few advantages over underwater telegraph cables.

Radiotelegraphy

Over several years starting in 1894, the Italian inventor Guglielmo Marconi worked on adapting the newly discovered phenomenon of radio waves to communication, turning what was essentially a laboratory experiment up to that point into a useful communication system, building the first radiotelegraphy system using them. Preece and the GPO in Britain at first supported and gave financial backing to Marconi's experiments conducted on Salisbury Plain from 1896. Preece had become convinced of the idea through his experiments with wireless induction. However, the backing was withdrawn when Marconi formed the Wireless Telegraph & Signal Company. GPO lawyers determined that the system was a telegraph under the meaning of the Telegraph Act and thus fell under the Post Office monopoly. This did not seem to hold back Marconi. After Marconi sent wireless telegraphic signals across the Atlantic Ocean in 1901, the system began being used for regular communication including ship-to-shore and ship-to-ship communication.

With this development, wireless telegraphy came to mean radiotelegraphy, Morse code transmitted by radio waves. The first radio transmitters, primitive spark gap transmitters used until World War I, could not transmit voice (audio signals). Instead, the operator would send the text message on a telegraph key, which turned the transmitter on and off, producing short ("dot") and long ("dash") pulses of radio waves, groups of which comprised the letters and other symbols of the Morse code. At the receiver, the signals could be heard as musical "beeps" in the earphones by the receiving operator, who would translate the code back into text. By 1910, communication by what had been called "Hertzian waves" was being universally referred to as "radio", and the term wireless telegraphy has been largely replaced by the more modern term "radiotelegraphy".

Continuous wave (CW)
The primitive spark-gap transmitters used until 1920 transmitted by a modulation method called damped wave.  As long as the telegraph key was pressed, the transmitter would produce a string of transient pulses of radio waves which repeated at an audio rate, usually between 50 and several thousand hertz.  In a receiver's earphone, this sounded like a musical tone, rasp or buzz.  Thus the Morse code "dots" and "dashes" sounded like beeps.  Damped wave had a large frequency bandwidth,  meaning that the radio signal was not a single frequency but occupied a wide band of frequencies. Damped wave transmitters had a limited range and interfered with the transmissions of other transmitters on adjacent frequencies.

After 1905 new types of radiotelegraph transmitters were invented which transmitted code using a new modulation method: continuous wave (CW) (designated by the International Telecommunication Union as emission type A1A). As long as the telegraph key was pressed, the transmitter produced a continuous sinusoidal wave of constant amplitude.  Since all the radio wave's energy was concentrated at a single frequency, CW transmitters could transmit further with a given power, and also caused virtually no interference to transmissions on adjacent frequencies.  The first transmitters able to produce continuous wave were the arc converter (Poulsen arc) transmitter, invented by Danish engineer Valdemar Poulsen in 1903, and the Alexanderson alternator, invented 1906-1912  by Reginald Fessenden and Ernst Alexanderson. These slowly replaced the spark transmitters in high power radiotelegraphy stations.

However, the radio receivers used for damped wave could not receive continuous wave.  Because the CW signal produced while the key was pressed was just an unmodulated carrier wave, it made no sound in a receiver's earphones. To receive a CW signal, some way had to be found to make the Morse code carrier wave pulses audible in a receiver.

This problem was solved by Reginald Fessenden in 1901. In his "heterodyne" receiver, the incoming radiotelegraph signal is mixed in the receiver's detector crystal or vacuum tube with a constant sine wave generated by an electronic oscillator in the receiver called a beat frequency oscillator (BFO).  The frequency of the oscillator  is offset from the radio transmitter's frequency .  In the detector the two frequencies subtract, and a beat frequency (heterodyne) at the difference between the two frequencies is produced: . If the BFO frequency is near enough to the radio station's frequency, the beat frequency is in the audio frequency range and can be heard in the receiver's earphones. During the "dots" and "dashes" of the signal, the beat tone is produced, while between them there is no carrier so no tone is produced. Thus the Morse code is audible as musical "beeps" in the earphones.

The BFO was rare until the invention in 1913 of the first practical electronic oscillator, the vacuum tube feedback oscillator by Edwin Armstrong.  After this time BFOs were a standard part of radiotelegraphy receivers. Each time the radio was tuned to a different station frequency, the BFO frequency had to be changed also, so the BFO oscillator had to be tunable. In later superheterodyne receivers from the 1930s on, the BFO signal was mixed with the constant intermediate frequency (IF) produced by the superheterodyne's detector. Therefore, the BFO could be a fixed frequency.

Continuous-wave vacuum tube transmitters replaced the other types of transmitter with the availability of power tubes after World War I because they were cheap.  CW became the standard method of transmitting radiotelegraphy by the 20s, damped wave spark transmitters were banned by 1930 and CW continues to be used today. Even today most communications receivers produced for use in shortwave communication stations have BFOs.

Radiotelegraphy industry

The International Radiotelegraph Union was unofficially established at the first International Radiotelegraph Convention in 1906, and was merged into the International Telecommunication Union in 1932. When the United States entered World War I, private radiotelegraphy stations were prohibited, which put an end to several pioneers' work in this field. By the 1920s, there was a worldwide network of commercial and government radiotelegraphic stations, plus extensive use of radiotelegraphy by ships for both commercial purposes and passenger messages. The transmission of sound (radiotelephony) began to displace radiotelegraphy by the 1920s for many applications, making possible radio broadcasting. Wireless telegraphy continued to be used for private person-to-person business, governmental, and military communication, such as telegrams and diplomatic communications, and evolved into radioteletype networks.  The ultimate implementation of wireless telegraphy was telex, using radio signals, which was developed in the 1930s and was for many years the only reliable form of communication between many distant countries. The most advanced standard, CCITT R.44, automated both routing and encoding of messages by short wave transmissions.

Today, due to more modern text transmission methods, Morse code radiotelegraphy for commercial use has become obsolete. On shipboard, the computer and satellite-linked GMDSS system have largely replaced Morse as a means of communication.

Regulation of radiotelegraphy
Continuous wave (CW) radiotelegraphy is regulated by the International Telecommunication Union (ITU) as emission type A1A.

The US Federal Communications Commission issues a lifetime commercial Radiotelegraph Operator License. This requires passing a simple written test on regulations, a more complex written exam on technology, and demonstrating Morse reception at 20 words per minute plain language and 16 wpm code groups. (Credit is given for amateur extra class licenses earned under the old 20 wpm requirement.)

Gallery

See also
 AT&T Corporation originally American Telephone and Telegraph Company
 Electrical telegraph
 Imperial Wireless Chain

References and notes
 General
 American Institute of Electrical Engineers. (1908). "Wireless Telephony – By R. A. Fessenden (Illustrated.)", Transactions of the American Institute of Electrical Engineers. New York: American Institute of Electrical Engineers.

Citations

Further reading
Listed by date [latest to earliest]

 Sarkar, T. K., & Baker, D. C. (2006). History of wireless. Hoboken, NJ: Wiley-Interscience.
 Hugh G. J. Aitken, Syntony and Spark: The Origins of Radio, . 1976.
 Elliot N. Sivowitch, A Technological Survey of Broadcasting’s Pre-History, Journal of Broadcasting, 15:1–20 (Winter 1970–71).
 Colby, F. M., Williams, T., & Wade, H. T. (1930). "Wireless Telegraphy", The New international encyclopaedia. New York: Dodd, Mead, and Co.
 "Wireless telegraphy", The Encyclopædia Britannica. (1922). London: Encyclopædia Britannica.
 Stanley, R. (1919). Text-book on wireless telegraphy. London: Longmans, Green
 Miessner, B. F. (1916). Radiodynamics: The wireless control of torpedoes and other mechanisms. New York: D. Van Nostrand Co
 Thompson, S. P. (1915). Elementary lessons in electricity and magnetism. New York: Macmillan.
 Stanley, R. (1914). Textbook on wireless telegraphy. London: Longmans, Green.
 Ashley, C. G., & Hayward, C. B. (1912). Wireless telegraphy and wireless telephony: an understandable presentation of the science of wireless transmission of intelligence. Chicago: American School of Correspondence.
 Massie, W. W., & Underhill, C. R. (1911). Wireless telegraphy and telephony popularly explained. New York: D. Van Nostrand.
 Captain S.S. Robison(1911). Developments in Wireless Telegraphy. International marine engineering, Volume 16. Simmons-Boardman Pub. Co.
 Bottone, S. R. (1910). Wireless telegraphy and Hertzian waves. London: Whittaker & Co.
 Erskine-Murray, J. (1909). A handbook of wireless telegraphy: its theory and practice, for the use of electrical engineers, students, and operators. New York: Van Nostrand.
 Twining, H. L. V., & Dubilier, W. (1909). Wireless telegraphy and high-frequency electricity; a manual containing detailed information for the construction of transformers, wireless telegraph, and high-frequency apparatus, with chapters on their theory and operation. Los Angeles, Cal: The author.
 The New Physics and Its Evolution. Chapter VII: A Chapter in the History of Science: Wireless telegraphy by Lucien Poincaré, eBook #15207, released 2005. [originally, published: New York, D. Appleton, and Company. 1909].
 Fleming, J. A. (1908). The principles of electric wave telegraphy. London: New York and Co.
 Simmons, H. H. (1908). " Wireless telegraphy", Outlines of electrical engineering. London: Cassell and Co.
 Murray, J. E. (1907). A handbook of wireless telegraphy. New York: D. Van Nostrand Co.; [etc.].
 Mazzotto, D., & Bottone, S. R. (1906). Wireless telegraphy and telephony. London: Whittaker & Co.
 Collins, A. F. (1905). Wireless telegraphy; its history, theory, and practice. New York: McGraw Pub.
 Sewall, C. H. (1904). Wireless telegraphy: its origins, development, inventions, and apparatus. New York: D. Van Nostrand.
 Trevert, E. (1904). The A.B.C. of wireless telegraphy; a plain treatise on Hertzian wave signaling; embracing theory, methods of operation, and how to build various pieces of the apparatus employed. Lynn, Mass: Bubier Pub.
 Fahie, J. J. (1900). A history of wireless telegraphy, 1838–1899: including some bare-wire proposals for subaqueous telegraphs. Edinburgh: W. Blackwood and Sons.
 Telegraphing across space, Electric wave method. The Electrical engineer. (1884). London: Biggs & Co.
 American Institute of Electrical Engineers. (1884). Transactions of the American Institute of Electrical Engineers. New York: American Institute of Electrical Engineers. ed., Contains Radio Telephony – By E. B. Craft and E. H. Colpitts (Illustrated). p. 305

External links

 John Joseph Fahie, A History of Wireless Telegraphy, 1838–1899: including some bare-wire proposals for subaqueous telegraphs, 1899 (first edition).
 John Joseph Fahie, A History of Wireless Telegraphy: including some bare-wire proposals for subaqueous telegraphs, 1901 (second edition).
 John Joseph Fahie, A History of Wireless Telegraphy: including some bare-wire proposals for subaqueous telegraphs, 1901 (second edition, in HTML format).
 Alfred Thomas Story, The Story of Wireless Telegraphy, 1904 
 James Bowman Lindsay A short biography on his efforts on electric lamps and telegraphy.
 Sparks Telegraph Key Review
 Principles of Radiotelegraphy (1919)

Radio
Telegraphy
Wireless communication systems